The Flying Club Cup is the second studio album by Balkan folk-influenced indie folk band Beirut, released on October 9, 2007 on 4AD Records. The album was released on iTunes on September 4, 2007.
 
The album features string arrangements by Arcade Fire contributor Owen Pallett, also known by his former stage name Final Fantasy.

Background
Zach Condon said about the name and inspiration for the album: "Back in the early 1900s...there used to be this hot air balloon festival in Paris—[the album's] titled after that and after this very bizarre 1910 photo I found [by Léon Gimpel]. It's one of the first color photos ever made, at the World's Fair, and it...shows all these ancient hot air balloons about to take off in the middle of Paris. I just thought it was the most surreal image I'd seen in a long time." He also said about the album sound: "I was listening to a lot of Jacques Brel and French chanson music—pop songs shrouded in big, glorious, over-the-top arrangements and all this drama—and that was in some sense unfamiliar territory to me. So I started buying new instruments and relying on things I wasn't necessarily comfortable with, like French horns and euphoniums, carrying these big, epic big brass parts that I used to do all on trumpets, and working with accordion and organ instead of all ukulele—very much throwing myself in the world of classical pop music, I guess you could say."

According to the program notes given out during Beirut's performance at The Society for Ethical Culture in New York on September 24, 2007, each song on the album is intended to evoke a different French city (although Guaymas, Sonora is a Mexican city).

The album's second track, Nantes, was sampled on the 2012 10 Day mixtape from American rapper Chance the Rapper.

Track listing

Artwork 
The cover photograph was taken in Brittany, France during the 1930s. It shows the Trestraou beach in the city of Perros-Guirec.

Videos
The whole album has been shot by La Blogothèque in Brooklyn. Each track filmed as a Take Away Show, available on the site of the album.

Charts

Weekly charts

Year-end charts

Certifications

Commercial performance
It was awarded a gold certification from the Independent Music Companies Association which indicated sales of at least 100,000 copies throughout Europe. As of 2009, sales in the United States have exceeded 78,000 copies, according to Nielsen SoundScan.

Personnel
The following people contributed to The Flying Club Cup:

Beirut
Zach Condon - accordion, composer, conch shell, engineer, euphonium, farfisa organ, flugelhorn, french horn, glockenspiel, mandolin, mixing, percussion, piano, trumpet, ukulele, vocals, backup vocals, wurlitzer
Jon Natchez - clarinet, bass clarinet, flute, mandolin, melodica, baritone saxophone
Perrin Cloutier - accordion, upright bass, cello, viola, backup vocals
Jason Poranski - mandolin, mandolin arrangement, backup vocals
Nick Petree - guitar, percussion, backup vocals
Kristin Ferebee - violin, backup vocals
Heather Trost - viola, violin
Kelly Pratt - euphonium
Paul Collins - bouzouki

Additional personnel
Owen Pallett - celeste, composer, harpsichord, organ, string arrangements, violin, vocals
Griffin Rodriguez - engineer, mastering, mixing, backup vocals
Alexandra Klasinski - design, layout design
Kristianna Smith - design, layout design
Kendrick Strauch - composer, piano
Mark Lawson - engineer
Ryan Condon - story

References

2007 albums
Beirut (band) albums
4AD albums
Ba Da Bing Records albums